LeRoy James Washburn (June 16, 1934 – April 13, 2019) was a Canadian politician. He served in the Legislative Assembly of New Brunswick from 1974 to 1982, as a Liberal member for the constituency of Oromocto.

References

New Brunswick Liberal Association MLAs
1934 births
2019 deaths